Ex Falso is a free and open source, cross-platform audio tag editor and library organizer. It is a user interface sharing the same backend software as Quod Libet, minus the ability to play music. It is developed by the same software team responsible for Quod Libet.

Tag editing Features 
 Complete Unicode support
 Changes to multiple files at once, even if files are in different formats
 Ability to tag files based on filenames with fully configurable formats
 Customizable renaming of files based on their tags and a user-supplied format
 Human readable tag references, e.g. <artist> or <title> rather than %a or %t, with support for "if not-null x else y" logic (e.g. <albumartist|albumartist|artist>)
 Fast track renumbering
 Add / edit bookmarks within files

See also
 List of tag editors

References

External links
 
 

2004 software
Cross-platform free software
GNOME Applications
Free audio software
Free software programmed in Python
Software that uses PyGObject
Tag editors
Tag editors for Linux
Tag editors that use GTK